Justin Somper is the British author of the Vampirates and the Allies & Assassins children's novel series.

Biography
Somper was born in St Albans, England, and graduated from the University of Warwick. He worked as a publicist before starting his writing career. He has since authored six books in a series called Vampirates and two under the title Allies and Assassins.

Bibliography

Vampirates series

 Demons of the Ocean (2005)
 Tide of Terror (2006)
 Blood Captain (2008)
 Black Heart (2009)
 Empire of Night (2010)
 Immortal War (2011)
 "Dead Deep" (2007) is a short story created for World Book Day 2007. It is available online.

Allies & Assassins series
 Allies & Assassins (2013)
 A Conspiracy of Princes (2015)

References

External links

 Vampirates official website
 

Alumni of the University of Warwick
English fantasy writers
21st-century English novelists
Living people
People from St Albans
Year of birth missing (living people)
British horror writers
English male short story writers
English short story writers
English male novelists
21st-century British short story writers
21st-century English male writers